Yichun West railway station is a railway station in Yichun, Heilongjiang, China. It will be the northern terminus of the Harbin–Yichun high-speed railway.

Construction officially began on 24 August 2022. When completed, it will be the most northerly high-speed railway station in China.

References 

Railway stations in Heilongjiang